The 1994–95 West Midlands (Regional) League season was the 95th in the history of the West Midlands (Regional) League, an English association football competition for semi-professional and amateur teams based in the West Midlands county, Shropshire, Herefordshire, Worcestershire and southern Staffordshire.

At the end of the previous season Midland Football Alliance was created. Ten Premier Division clubs joined newly formed league, while their places was taken by Division One clubs.

Premier Division

The Premier Division featured eight clubs which competed in the division last season, along with eleven new clubs, promoted from Division One:
Bilston United
Bloxwich Strollers
Ettingshall Holy Trinity
Gornal Athletic
Hill Top Rangers
Ludlow Town
Malvern Town
Manders
Stafford Town
Tividale
Walsall Wood

League table

References

External links

1994–95
9